TrekEarth was an online community of travel photographers who uploaded their images to the site. The goal of TrekEarth was to learn more about the world through photography; it used an encouraging critique system to enable users to comment on each other's photography. In addition to uploading their own images and critiquing those of others, members could upload post-processed workshop images. The site also contained forums covering topics ranging from tips and techniques to note-writing.

As of November 2022, the multilingual site hosted over 1,291,841 photographs from more than192 countries across the world. TrekEarth was also related to its sister sites TrekLens and TrekNature, which catered to the creative and nature communities of photographers.

All photographs in TrekEarth are under the copyright of the members. Any use (commercial or not) requires permission. There is no close account option.

History
TrekEarth was created by Adam Silverman in October 2002 as a wider version of his previous project TrekJapan.

TrekEarth was closed on November 28, 2022 by Internet Brands, who acquired the site in 2009.

Features

Uploading
TrekEarth members could upload only one photograph per day. This limit was intended to ensure quality over quantity in the gallery. Members could add a title and a short note describing the photograph. Photo notes on TrekEarth are examples of "word bytes", the textual equivalent of sound bites. The photographs are categorized by location, and can be grouped in themes, or travelogues. Other data (usually from the Exif) are also visible of the photo page, along with other photographs uploaded by the member. TrekEarth did not allow, and actively removed photographs of family or pets.  Photographers could also provide the coordinates of the photographing location.

Critique System
The critique system enabled users to comment on each other's uploads. Quality of critiquing was strongly encouraged, and replies to critiques could continue in discussion forums about the photograph. The critique system also enabled users to give each other "points", which are shown next to the member's user ID. Members can also rate the usefulness of each other's critiques; these "usefulness" points can accumulate into Silver or Gold icons, reflecting the ability of the member to write critiques or notes, or edit workshop photos. The critique system also helped users to improve on their photography skills because of the various opinions.

Workshops
Members could post-process others' photos, and upload up to 2 workshops per day. They were also encouraged to elaborate on the techniques used, ensuring that the edit is as instructive as possible

References

External links
Official site
web.archive of last saved page.

Internet properties established in 2002
Photography websites